Franciscan High School originated as a boarding school for girls as, "Ladycliff Academy," on the grounds of Ladycliff College, in Highland Falls, NY, next to West Point Military Academy.  It was run by the Franciscan Missionary Sisters of the Sacred Heart whose Order and motherhouse can still be found in Peekskill, NY today.  In September, 1961, under the guidance and direction of the then Principal, Sister Mary Philip, FMSC, the Academy moved to Mohegan Lake, NY.  In the early 1970s, the Order decided to admit boys and established the school as co-ed with the new name of, "Franciscan High School," which remained in operation until 1991.

Defunct Catholic secondary schools in New York (state)